Anton Smit (22 August 1945) is a Dutch screenwriter, television and film producer.

Selected filmography

Feature films
 Familie (2001)
 De Tweeling (2002)
 Van God Los (2003)
 Cloaca (2003)
 Leef! (2005)
 Ik omhels je met 1000 armen (2006)
 Unfinished Sky (2007)
 Bride Flight (2008)
 Separation City (2009)
 Vreemd bloed (2010)
 Majesteit (2011)

Television
 Fort Alpha (1996-1997)
 Oud Geld (1998-1999)
 Zinloos (2004)
 Eilandgasten (2005)
 Escort (2006)
 Dag in dag uit (2008)
 Witte vis (2009)

References

External links

Living people
Dutch film producers
Dutch television producers
1945 births